Venucia e30 is a nameplate used for two different vehicles sold in China.

Vehicles using the nameplate are:

 First generation Venucia e30, a rebadged first generation Nissan Leaf.
 Second generation Venucia e30, a rebadged Renault City K-ZE.